This is a list of aircraft of the Aerospace Force of the Islamic Revolutionary Guard Corps.

Fixed-wing aircraft

Helicopters

Unmanned aerial vehicles

See also

 List of aircraft of the Iranian Air Force

References

Lists of military aircraft
 
Aircraft
Aircraft